Sukashitrochus lyallensis is a species of minute sea snail, a marine gastropod mollusc in the family Scissurellidae.

Habitat
Sukashitrochus lyallensis is generally found in New Zealand. It is found in water up to a depth of 240 m.

Shell description
At 1.5 mm in height and 1.8 mm in width, its shell is larger than Sinezona iota and Sinezona laques.

References

 Powell A. W. B., New Zealand Mollusca, William Collins Publishers Ltd, Auckland, New Zealand 1979 
 Geiger D.L. (2012) Monograph of the little slit shells. Volume 1. Introduction, Scissurellidae. pp. 1-728. Volume 2. Anatomidae, Larocheidae, Depressizonidae, Sutilizonidae, Temnocinclidae. pp. 729–1291. Santa Barbara Museum of Natural History Monographs Number 7

Scissurellidae
Gastropods of New Zealand
Gastropods described in 1927
Taxa named by Harold John Finlay